Chandrashekhar B. Khare (born 1968) is a professor of mathematics at the University of California Los Angeles. In 2005, he made a major advance in the field of Galois representations and number theory by proving the level 1 Serre conjecture, and later a proof of the full conjecture with Jean-Pierre Wintenberger. He has been on the Mathematical Sciences jury for the Infosys Prize from 2015, serving as Jury Chair from 2020.

Professional career
Resident of Mumbai, India and completed his undergraduate education at Trinity College, Cambridge. He finished his thesis in 1995 under the supervision of Haruzo Hida at California Institute of Technology. His Ph.D. thesis was published in the  Duke Mathematical Journal. He proved Serre's conjecture with Jean-Pierre Wintenberger, published in Inventiones Mathematicae.

He started his career as a Fellow at Tata Institute of Fundamental Research. As of the year 2021, he is a professor at the University of California, Los Angeles.

Awards and honors
Khare is the winner of the INSA Young Scientist Award (1999), Fermat Prize (2007), the Infosys Prize (2010), and the Cole Prize (2011).

He gave an invited talk at the International Congress of Mathematicians in 2010, on the topic of "Number Theory".

In 2012 he became a fellow of the American Mathematical Society and was elected as a Fellow of the Royal Society.

References

External links

Chandrashekhar Khare's homepage
Another proof for Fermat's last theorem
 

1968 births
Living people
Indian number theorists
21st-century Indian mathematicians
Institute for Advanced Study visiting scholars
University of California, Los Angeles faculty
American Hindus
20th-century Indian mathematicians
Fellows of the American Mathematical Society
Fellows of the Royal Society
American people of Marathi descent
American people of Indian descent
California Institute of Technology alumni
Alumni of the University of Cambridge